The Opel Maxx was a concept car produced by the German car manufacturer Opel. It was first displayed at the 1995 Geneva Motor Show and was also shown as the Vauxhall Maxx at the London Motor Show the same year. The Maxx 2 was shown the following year, again at the Geneva Motor Show, with a new three-cylinder  petrol engine, matched with a five-speed sequential gearbox.

The Maxx was designed by Danny Larson and Frank Leopold.

References

Maxx